Sklené may refer to places:

Czech Republic
Sklené (Svitavy District), a municipality and village in the Pardubice Region
Sklené (Žďár nad Sázavou District), a municipality and village in the Vysočina Region
Sklené, a village and part of Malá Morava in the Olomouc Region
Sklené nad Oslavou, a municipality and village in the Vysočina Region

Slovakia
Sklené, Turčianske Teplice District, a municipality and village in the Žilina Region